The Quinipissa (sometimes spelled Kinipissa in French sources) were an indigenous group living on the lower Mississippi River, in present-day Louisiana, as reported by René-Robert Cavelier, Sieur de La Salle in 1682.

They were joined together with the Mougoulacha. The combined group shared a village with the Bayagoula. In 1700 the Bayagoula massacred both the Quinipissa and Mougoulacha. In 1682, La Salle encountered a group of Quinipissa living with the Koroa in a village on the western bank of the Mississippi River.

Language

The Quinipissa may have spoken the same language as the Mougoulacha and Bayagoula. The Bayagoula language is only attested with a single word.

Albert Gatschet considered Quinipissa a Muskogean language Coast Choctaw ("Coast Chaʼhta") based on evidence that many peoples of this area spoke the lingua franca Mobilian Jargon and have names that appear to be exonyms of Mobilian Jargon or Muskogean origin. This is repeated by John W. Powell and John Swanton. However, a map by Nicolas de Fer states that all nations of this region spoke different languages and barely understood each other. Thus, there is no real linguistic evidence to conclude that the Quinipissa are Muskogean.

References

External links
 Indian Tribal Histories Quahatika-Quinipissa

Bibliography

 de Fer, Nicolas. (1701). Les costes aux environs de la Riviere de Misisipi, decouverte par Mr. de la Salle en 1683, et reconnues par Mr. le chevallier d'Yberville en 1698 et 1699.
 Gatschet, Albert S. (1884). A migration legend of the Creek Indians (Vol. 1). Philadelphia: D. G. Brinton.
 Goddard, Ives. (2005). The indigenous languages of the Southeast. Anthropological Linguistics, 47 (1), 1-60.
 Margry, Pierre (Ed.). (1876-1886). Découvertes et établissements des Français dans l'ouest et dans le sud de l'Amérique septentrionale (1614-1754) (Vols. 1-6). Paris: D. Jouaust.
 Powell, John W. (1891). Indian linguistic families of America north of Mexico. Bureau of American Ethnology annual report (No. 7, pp. 1–142). Washington, D.C.: Government Printing Office.
 Swanton, John R. (1911). Indian tribes of the lower Mississippi Valley and adjacent coast of the Gulf of Mexico. Bureau of American Ethnology bulletin (No. 43). Washington, D.C.: Government Printing Office.

Native American tribes in Louisiana
Pre-statehood history of Louisiana
Unclassified languages of North America